Karlsborg (outdatedly ) is a locality and the seat of Karlsborg Municipality, Västra Götaland County, Sweden. It had 3,551 inhabitants in 2010. This garrison town lies at the shore of lake Vättern in Västergötland.

History
The town of Karlsborg was established and grew due to the construction of Karlsborg Fortress, during the 19th century. According to the principles of a central defense, the fortress was designated as the reserve capital of Sweden in the event of war.

References 

Populated lakeshore places in Sweden
Populated places in Västra Götaland County
Populated places in Karlsborg Municipality
Municipal seats of Västra Götaland County
Swedish municipal seats